Radford is an English toponymic surname deriving from one of several places in England named "Radford", chief among these being Radford, Coventry and Radford, Nottingham.  The most closely related surname to Radford is "Radforth", while a common variant is "Redford".

Notable people sharing this surname include:

Born in 19th Century
Arthur W. Radford (1896–1973), Admiral in United States Navy
Basil Radford (1897–1952), English actor
Dollie Radford (1858–1920), English poet and author
Edmund Ashworth Radford (1881–1944), English Conservative political figure
Ernest Radford (1857–1919), English poet
George Heynes Radford (1851–1917), British Liberal political figure
Henry Radford (1896–1972), English cricketer
Lewis Radford (1869–1937), English Anglican bishop and author
Paul Radford (1861–1945), United States baseball player
Wally Radford (1886–1943), English footballer
William Radford (1808–1890), Admiral in United States Navy
William Radford (politician) (1814–1870), United States political figure

Born in 20th Century
Albert Ernest Radford (1918–2006), United States academic and botanist
Andy Radford (1944–2006), British Anglican bishop, Bishop of Taunton
Barbara Radford, British figure skater
Benjamin Radford (born 1970), United States science writer and journalist
Bob Radford (1943–2004), Australian cricket administrator
Brendan Radford (fl. 1990s-present), Australian musician
Brian Radford (fl. 1950s), Welsh rugby player
Charlie Radford (1900–1924), British footballer
Elaine Radford (born 1958), United States author
Eric Radford (born 1985), Canadian figure skater
Glen Radford (born 1962), Zambian-born South African cricketer
Howard Radford (born 1930), Welsh footballer
Jim Radford (1928–2020), British D-Day veteran, peace campaigner and folk-singer
John Radford (footballer) (born 1947), English footballer
John Radford (broadcaster) (fl. 1980s), Canadian director of radio and television stations
Kristine Kunce (born 1970), Australian tennis player, also known as Kristine Radford
Lee Radford (born 1979), English rugby player
Luis Radford (fl. 2000s), Canadian educator
Mark Radford (basketball) (born 1959), American former National Basketball Association player
Mark Radford (footballer) (born 1968), English former footballer
Michael Radford (born 1946), English film director and screenwriter
Natalie Radford (born 1966), Canadian actress
Neal Radford (born 1957), North Rhodesia (now Zambia)-n born English cricketer
Peter Radford (born 1939), English athlete in track
Phil Radford (born 1970s), United States environmental activist, director of Greenpeace
Ralegh Radford (1900–1999), English archaeologist
Richard A. Radford (1939–2006), British-born American economist, notable for his article on POW camp economics 
Robert Radford (1874–1933), English-born United States musician
Robert Radford (footballer) (1900-?), English footballer
Ron Radford (born 1949), Australian art museum curator
Ronald Radford (guitarist) (fl. 1990s-present), United States musician (flamenco guitar)
Ronnie Radford (1943-2022), English footballer
Rosemary Radford Ruether (born 1936), United States academic and theologian
Sheri Radford (fl. 1990s-present), Canadian author
Steve Radford (born 1957), British Liberal political figure
Toby Radford (born 1971), Welsh cricketer
Wayne Radford (basketball) (1956–2021), United States athlete in basketball
Wayne Radford (cricketer) (born 1958), Zambian-born South African cricketer

References

See also
 Radford family

English-language surnames
English toponymic surnames